Hermann Boerner, also written "Börner" (11 July 1906 – 3 June 1982) was a German mathematician who worked on variation calculus, complex analysis, and group representation theory.

Publications
Boerner Carathéodorys Eingang zur Variationsrechnung, Jahresbericht DMV 1953
Boerner Variationsrechnung aus dem Stokesschen Satz, Mathematische Zeitschrift volume 46, 1940, page 709
Boerner Über die Legendreschen Bedingungen und die Feldtheorie in der Variationsrechnung der mehrfachen Integrale, Mathem.Zeitschrift 1940, page 720
Boerner Über die Extremalen und geodätischen Felder in der Variationsrechnung der mehrfachen Integrale, Mathematische Annalen volume 112, 1936, page 187
Boerner Darstellungstheorie der endlichen Gruppen, Teubner 1967, Enzyklopädie der mathematischen Wissenschaften

References

External links
 Hermann Boerner at the Mathematics Genealogy Project

20th-century German mathematicians
1906 births
1982 deaths